Karol Aída Cariola Oliva (born April 1, 1987) is a Chilean politician, and former president of the Federación de Estudiantes de la Universidad de Concepción (University of Concepción Student Federation) for 2010. She was elected General Secretary of the Juventudes Comunistas de Chile, abbr. JJ.CC., (the youth wing of the Communist Party of Chile) at the organizations XIII Congress held in October 2011. Cariola is the second woman to hold this post in the Communist Youth of Chile after the late communist leader Gladys Marin (1941-2005).

On August 4, 2013, Cariola emerged as the leading congressional candidate in the New Majority coalition's primary elections for the electoral district of Recoleta and Independencia. 

Subsequently, during the Chilean general election held on November 17, 2013 she won 38.47% of the votes and became the deputy-elect for the 19th electoral Santiago district of Recoleta and Independencia. She commenced to serve a four-year term in the Chilean Congress on 11 March 2014. On March 11, 2022, it was agreed that as part of a rotation agreement, she would become Speaker of the Chilean Chamber of Deputies starting 21 October 2022.

In December 2021 Cariola was elected by party members to join the central committee of the Communist Party of Chile.

Student movement for public education
Cariola was elected General Secretary of the JJ.CC. amidst one of the most significant mass social mobilization in recent Chilean history – referred by the media as the Chilean Winter. This mobilization saw students across Chile refuse to return to school or university, from April 2011 to the end of the academic year, in protest and to demand an end to the privatization of education.  Cariola has stated that the student mobilization, protests and strikes had a political nature and she refuted the statement made by the Chilean government spokesperson Andrés Chadwick that the CONFECH (Chile's Confederation of Student Unions) has been taken over by extremist elements.

In an interview with CNN Chile Cariola stated that it was a grave mistake to refer to the student movement in that manner: 
“I think our country is at a historic moment, that it is necessary to generate structural changes….We have had a process that has led this country to develop a new consciousness. Chile today is not the same that it was 6 months ago, there is an eagerness to generate changes and the need to do so.”

Parliamentary candidature and general elections
Cariola has stated that "Chile and its people have to draft a new constitution" and has said that within the Nueva Mayoria coalition she intends to fight for a Constituent Assembly to oversee a change to the existing Chilean Constitution. Cariola - in line with the leader of the Nueva Mayoria, Michelle Bachelet - believes that the Chilean Constitution is illegitimate because it was introduced in the absence of political democracy by the Pinochet regime on September 11, 1980. Cariola also states that if she wins a seat in the Chilean Chamber of Deputies she will work to see a fair labour code implemented with an institution to protect workers' rights and the automatic unionization of all workers in or entering the workforce.

New Majority coalition's primary elections
The primary elections for the New Majority coalition commenced on August 4, 2013. These parliamentary primaries were set to determine which two candidates from the Nueva Mayoria pact in a given electorate will stand for the Chilean elections in November 2013. In the primary election for the 19th Santiago electorate of Recoleta-Independencia Cariola received the highest number of votes from the local constituents.

Chilean general elections 2013
 2013 Chilean general election: deputy for the 19thelectoral Santiago district of Recoleta and Independencia 

Chilean general elections 2017
 2017 Chilean general election: deputy for the 9th electoral district of Recoleta, Independencia, Renca, Quinta Normal, Lo Prado, Huechuraba, Conchalí, Cerro Navia.

Speaker-elect of Chilean Chamber of Deputies

On 11 March 2022, a coalition consisting of eleven parties and independents voted to have Carlola served President of the Chilean Chamber of Deputies by 22 October 2022 and 30 June 2023.

Criticism
Other critics point to her explicit support for the governments of Fidel Castro and Hugo Chavez.

See also
Communist Party of Chile
New Majority (Chile)
2006 student protests in Chile
2011 Chilean protests

References

External links

 Karol Cariola -Diputada Por Recoleta e Independencia Blogspot
 Karol Cariola O. - on Twitter
 Karol Cariola: a swallow of the student movement.  The Prism
  Karol Cariola, Srikandi Merah Gerakan Mahasiswa Chili.  BERDIKARI

Interviews and talks
  Camila Vallejo and Karol Cariola on the Student movement against the private education model – 24 March 2012 TV Publica Argentina via YouTube
  Karol Cariola on her congressional candidature for the electorate of Recoleta-Independencia – 20 January 2013 CNN Chile via YouTube
  Karol Cariola on her trip to Cuba and her meeting with students, workers and Fidel Castro in Havana, Cuba – 5 April 2012 Cuba Hoy via YouTube
  Karol Cariola, as deputy-elect "we do not rule out the construction of socialism in Chile"  - 22 November 2013 Chilevision via YouTube

1987 births
Living people
Anti-corporate activists
Chilean activists
Chilean communists
Chilean Marxists
Chilean midwives
Members of the Chamber of Deputies of Chile
Communist Party of Chile politicians
People from Santiago
University of Concepción alumni
Women members of the Chamber of Deputies of Chile